Kooistra is a Dutch-language surname. Notable people with the surname include:

Joost Kooistra (born 1976), Dutch volleyball player
Lorraine Janzen Kooistra, Canadian academic
Paul Kooistra (born 1942), American minister and college president
 (1922–1988), Dutch artist and advocate for a global basic income
Sam Kooistra (1935–2010), American water polo player, brother of William
Scott Kooistra (born 1980), American football player
William Kooistra (1926–1995), American water polo player, brother of Sam
Wytze Kooistra (born 1982), Dutch volleyball player

Dutch-language surnames